In statistical mechanics, the grand canonical ensemble (also known as the macrocanonical ensemble) is the statistical ensemble that is used to represent the possible states of a mechanical system of particles that are in thermodynamic equilibrium (thermal and chemical) with a reservoir. The system is said to be open in the sense that the system can exchange energy and particles with a reservoir, so that various possible states of the system can differ in both their total energy and total number of particles. The system's volume, shape, and other external coordinates are kept the same in all possible states of the system.

The thermodynamic variables of the grand canonical ensemble are chemical potential and absolute temperature (symbol: . The ensemble is also dependent on mechanical variables such as volume (symbol:  which influence the nature of the system's internal states. This ensemble is therefore sometimes called the   ensemble, as each of these three quantities are constants of the ensemble.

Basics 

In simple terms, the grand canonical ensemble assigns a probability  to each distinct microstate given by the following exponential:

The number  is known as the grand potential and is constant for the ensemble. However, the probabilities and  will vary if different  are selected. The grand potential  serves two roles: to provide a normalization factor for the probability distribution (the probabilities, over the complete set of microstates, must add up to one); and, many important ensemble averages can be directly calculated from the function .

In the case where more than one kind of particle is allowed to vary in number, the probability expression generalizes to

where  is the chemical potential for the first kind of particles,  is the number of that kind of particle in the microstate,  is the chemical potential for the second kind of particles and so on ( is the number of distinct kinds of particles). However, these particle numbers should be defined carefully (see the note on particle number conservation below).

The distribution of the grand canonical ensemble is called generalized Boltzmann distribution by some authors.

Grand ensembles are apt for use when describing systems such as the electrons in a conductor, or the photons in a cavity, where the shape is fixed but the energy and number of particles can easily fluctuate due to contact with a reservoir (e.g., an electrical ground or a dark surface, in these cases). The grand canonical ensemble provides a natural setting for an exact derivation of the Fermi–Dirac statistics or Bose–Einstein statistics for a system of non-interacting quantum particles (see examples below).

 Note on formulation
The equations in this article (in terms of grand potential) may be restated in terms of the grand partition function by simple mathematical manipulations.

Applicability

The grand canonical ensemble is the ensemble that describes the possible states of an isolated system that is in thermal and chemical equilibrium with a reservoir (the derivation proceeds along lines analogous to the heat bath derivation of the normal canonical ensemble, and can be found in Reif). The grand canonical ensemble applies to systems of any size, small or large; it is only necessary to assume that the reservoir with which it is in contact is much larger (i.e., to take the macroscopic limit).

The condition that the system is isolated is necessary in order to ensure it has well-defined thermodynamic quantities and evolution. In practice, however, it is desirable to apply the grand canonical ensemble to describe systems that are in direct contact with the reservoir, since it is that contact that ensures the equilibrium. The use of the grand canonical ensemble in these cases is usually justified either 1) by assuming that the contact is weak, or 2) by incorporating a part of the reservoir connection into the system under analysis, so that the connection's influence on the region of interest is correctly modeled. Alternatively, theoretical approaches can be used to model the influence of the connection, yielding an open statistical ensemble.

Another case in which the grand canonical ensemble appears is when considering a system that is large and thermodynamic (a system that is "in equilibrium with itself"). Even if the exact conditions of the system do not actually allow for variations in energy or particle number, the grand canonical ensemble can be used to simplify calculations of some thermodynamic properties. The reason for this is that various thermodynamic ensembles (microcanonical, canonical) become equivalent in some aspects to the grand canonical ensemble, once the system is very large. Of course, for small systems, the different ensembles are no longer equivalent even in the mean. As a result, the grand canonical ensemble can be highly inaccurate when applied to small systems of fixed particle number, such as atomic nuclei.

Properties

Grand potential, ensemble averages, and exact differentials 

The partial derivatives of the function  give important grand canonical ensemble average quantities:

Exact differential: From the above expressions, it can be seen that the function  has the exact differential

Thermodynamic fluctuations: The variances in energy and particle numbers are

Correlations in fluctuations: The covariances of particle numbers and energy are

Example ensembles

The usefulness of the grand canonical ensemble is illustrated in the examples below. In each case the grand potential is calculated on the basis of the relationship

which is required for the microstates' probabilities to add up to 1.

Statistics of noninteracting particles

Bosons and fermions (quantum)

In the special case of a quantum system of many non-interacting particles, the thermodynamics are simple to compute.
Since the particles are non-interacting, one can compute a series of single-particle stationary states, each of which represent a separable part that can be included into the total quantum state of the system.
For now let us refer to these single-particle stationary states as orbitals (to avoid confusing these "states" with the total many-body state), with the provision that each possible internal particle property (spin or polarization) counts as a separate orbital.
Each orbital may be occupied by a particle (or particles), or may be empty.

Since the particles are non-interacting, we may take the viewpoint that each orbital forms a separate thermodynamic system.
Thus each orbital is a grand canonical ensemble unto itself, one so simple that its statistics can be immediately derived here. Focusing on just one orbital labelled , the total energy for a microstate of  particles in this orbital will be , where  is the characteristic energy level of that orbital. The grand potential for the orbital is given by one of two forms, depending on whether the orbital is bosonic or fermionic:

In each case the value  gives the thermodynamic average number of particles on the orbital: the Fermi–Dirac distribution for fermions, and the Bose–Einstein distribution for bosons.

Indistinguishable classical particles 
In classical mechanics it is also possible to consider indistinguishable particles (in fact, indistinguishability is a prerequisite for defining a chemical potential in a consistent manner; all particles of a given kind must be interchangeable). We again consider placing multiple particles of the same kind into the same microstate of single-particle phase space, which we again call an "orbital". However, compared to quantum mechanics, the classical case is complicated by the fact that a microstate in classical mechanics does not refer to a single point in phase space but rather to an extended region in phase space: one microstate contains an infinite number of states, all distinct but of similar character. As a result, when multiple particles are placed into the same orbital, the overall collection of the particles (in the system phase space) does not count as one whole microstate but rather only a fraction of a microstate, because identical states (formed by permutation of identical particles) should not be overcounted. The overcounting correction factor is the factorial of the number of particles.

The statistics in this case take the form of an exponential power series

the value  corresponding to Maxwell–Boltzmann statistics.

Ionization of an isolated atom

The grand canonical ensemble can be used to predict whether an atom prefers to be in a neutral state or ionized state.
An atom is able to exist in ionized states with more or fewer electrons compared to neutral. As shown below, ionized states may be thermodynamically preferred depending on the environment.
Consider a simplified model where the atom can be in a neutral state or in one of two ionized states (a detailed calculation also includes the degeneracy factors of the states):
 charge neutral state, with  electrons and energy .
 an oxidized state ( electrons) with energy 
 a reduced state ( electrons) with energy 

The grand potential in this case is thus determined by

The quantity  is critical in this case, for determining the balance between the various states. This value is determined by the environment around the atom.

If one of these atoms is placed into a vacuum box, then , the work function of the box lining material. Comparing the tables of work function for various solid materials with the tables of electron affinity and ionization energy for atomic species, it is clear that many combinations would result in a neutral atom, however some specific combinations would result in the atom preferring an ionized state: e.g., a halogen atom in a ytterbium box, or a cesium atom in a tungsten box. At room temperature this situation is not stable since the atom tends to adsorb to the exposed lining of the box instead of floating freely. At high temperatures, however, the atoms are evaporated from the surface in ionic form; this spontaneous surface ionization effect has been used as a cesium ion source.

At room temperature, this example finds application in semiconductors, where the ionization of a dopant atom is well described by this ensemble. Of course, the ionization energy and electron affinity of the dopant atom are strongly modified relative to their vacuum values. A typical donor dopant in silicon, phosphorus, has ;
The value of  depends strongly on electrostatics, however, so under some circumstances it is possible to de-ionize the dopant.

Meaning of chemical potential, generalized "particle number"

In order for a particle number to have an associated chemical potential, it must be conserved during the internal dynamics of the system, and only able to change when the system exchanges particles with an external reservoir.

If the particles can be created out of energy during the dynamics of the system, then an associated  term must not appear in the probability expression for the grand canonical ensemble. In effect, this is the same as requiring that  for that kind of particle. Such is the case for photons in a black cavity, whose number regularly change due to absorption and emission on the cavity walls. (On the other hand, photons in a highly reflective cavity can be conserved and caused to have a nonzero .)

In some cases the number of particles is not conserved and the  represents a more abstract conserved quantity:

 Chemical reactions: Chemical reactions can convert one type of molecule to another; if reactions occur then the  must be defined such that they do not change during the chemical reaction.
 High energy particle physics: Ordinary particles can be spawned out of pure energy, if a corresponding antiparticle is created. If this sort of process is allowed, then neither the number of particles nor antiparticles are conserved. Instead,  is conserved. As particle energies increase, there are more possibilities to convert between particle types, and so there are fewer numbers that are truly conserved. At the very highest energies the only conserved numbers are electric charge, weak isospin, and baryon number − lepton number.

On the other hand, in some cases a single kind of particle may have multiple conserved numbers:

 Closed compartments: In a system composed of multiple compartments that share energy but do not share particles, it is possible to set the chemical potentials separately for each compartment. For example, a capacitor is composed of two isolated conductors and is charged by applying a difference in electron chemical potential.
 Slow equilibration: In some quasi-equilibrium situations it is possible to have two distinct populations of the same kind of particle in the same location, which are each equilibrated internally but not with each other. Though not strictly in equilibrium, it may be useful to name quasi-equilibrium chemical potentials which can differ among the different populations. Examples: (semiconductor physics) distinct quasi-Fermi levels (electron chemical potentials) in the conduction band and valence band; (spintronics) distinct spin-up and spin-down chemical potentials; (cryogenics) distinct parahydrogen and orthohydrogen chemical potentials.

Precise expressions for the ensemble

The precise mathematical expression for statistical ensembles has a distinct form depending on the type of mechanics under consideration (quantum or classical), as the notion of a "microstate" is considerably different. In quantum mechanics, the grand canonical ensemble affords a simple description since diagonalization provides a set of distinct microstates of a system, each with well-defined energy and particle number. The classical mechanical case is more complex as it involves not stationary states but instead an integral over canonical phase space.

Quantum mechanical 

The grand canonical ensemble is the density matrix

where  is the system's total energy operator (Hamiltonian),  is the system's total particle number operator for particles of type 1,  is the total particle number operator for particles of type 2, and so on.  is the matrix exponential operator. The grand potential  is determined by the probability normalization condition that the density matrix has a trace of one, :

Since the energy and particle numbers are all separately conserved, these operators are mutually commuting.

Given such an eigenbasis, the grand canonical ensemble is simply

where the sum is over the complete set of states with state  having  total energy,  particles of type 1,  particles of type 2, and so on.

Classical mechanical

The expression for the grand canonical ensemble is somewhat more delicate than the canonical ensemble since:
 The number of particles and thus the number of coordinates  varies between the different phase spaces, and,
 it is vital to consider whether permuting similar particles counts as a distinct state or not.
In a system of particles, the number of degrees of freedom  depends on the number of particles in a way that depends on the physical situation. For example, in a three-dimensional gas of monoatoms , however in molecular gases there will also be rotational and vibrational degrees of freedom.

The probability density function for the grand canonical ensemble is:

where
  is the energy of the system, a function of the phase ,

This integral is taken over the entire available phase space for the given numbers of particles.

Overcounting correction 

A well-known problem in the statistical mechanics of fluids (gases, liquids, plasmas) is how to treat particles that are similar or identical in nature: should they be regarded as distinguishable or not? In the system's equation of motion each particle is forever tracked as a distinguishable entity, and yet there are also valid states of the system where the positions of each particle have simply been swapped: these states are represented at different places in phase space, yet would seem to be equivalent.

From this point of view, ensembles include every permuted state as a separate microstate. Although appearing benign at first, this leads to a problem of severely non-extensive entropy in the canonical ensemble, known today as the Gibbs paradox. In the grand canonical ensemble a further logical inconsistency occurs: the number of distinguishable permutations depends not only on how many particles are in the system, but also on how many particles are in the reservoir (since the system may exchange particles with a reservoir). In this case the entropy and chemical potential are non-extensive but also badly defined, depending on a parameter (reservoir size) that should be irrelevant.

To solve these issues it is necessary that the exchange of two similar particles (within the system, or between the system and reservoir) must not be regarded as giving a distinct state of the system. In order to incorporate this fact, integrals are still carried over full phase space but the result is divided by

which is the number of different permutations possible. The division by  neatly corrects the overcounting that occurs in the integral over all phase space.

It is of course possible to include distinguishable types of particles in the grand canonical ensemble—each distinguishable type  is tracked by a separate particle counter  and chemical potential . As a result, the only consistent way to include "fully distinguishable" particles in the grand canonical ensemble is to consider every possible distinguishable type of those particles, and to track each and every possible type with a separate particle counter and separate chemical potential.

Notes

References 

Statistical ensembles